Physocephala rufipes is a species of fly from the genus Physocephala in the family Conopidae. Their larvae are endoparasites of bumble bees of the genus Bombus. It is common throughout much of Europe.

References 

Parasitic flies
Parasites of bees
Conopidae
Insects described in 1781
Muscomorph flies of Europe
Endoparasites